Parasuram is a 2003 Indian Tamil-language action film written and directed by Arjun. It stars himself, Abbas, Goundamani, Kiran Rathod, Gayathri Raguram, and Rahul Dev in lead roles. The music was composed by A. R. Rahman.

Plot
The case is entrusted to Assistant Police Commissioner Parasuram (Arjun), a patriotic officer tough as a nail. His love is Anjali (Kiran Rathod), who has nothing much to do in the narrative. The bad guy is Akash (Rahul Dev), who sends misguided youths to Pakistan for training and brings them back to subvert our peaceful state. Akash's identity is a secret, while Shiva (Abbas) pops in as Naghulan's (Shyam Ganesh) brother and gives a speech against terrorism. Meena (Gayathri Raguram) is a petty thief who has a soft corner on our macho officer. The rest of the story is all about how Parasuram nails the bad guys with excessive blood spewing.

Cast

 Arjun as ACP Parasuram IPS
 Abbas as Shiva
 Kiran Rathod as Anjali
 Gayathri Raguram as Meena
 Goundamani as Sub-Inspector Thangaraj
 Rahul Dev as Akash / Sankaran Kutty
 Rajesh as Director General of Police
 Shyam Ganesh as Naghulan, Shiva's elder brother
 Vennira Aadai Moorthy as Anjali's father
 Vaiyapuri as Anjali's uncle
 Ramji as Master
 Mansoor Ali Khan as Home Minister Vishwanathan
 Rajyalakshmi as ACP Parasuram's mother
 Charuhasan as Judge
 Vinu Chakravarthy as Kader Mohammed
 Indhu as Indira
Baburaj

Production
The film was initially launched under the title Ashoka with Shaji Kailas as director and Samyuktha Varma as the lead actress alongside Arjun. Later he was Shaji opted out from the film due to creative differences, with Arjun himself taking the reins of directorial.

Soundtrack

The songs were composed by A.R. Rahman. The background score was composed by Rahman's assistant Pravin Mani. The soundtrack is regarded as average by Rahman's standard.

Reception
Sify.com, called this movie as "pathetic".

References

External links
 

2003 films
2000s Tamil-language films
Films directed by Arjun Sarja
Indian action films
Films about terrorism in India
Fictional portrayals of the Tamil Nadu Police
Films scored by A. R. Rahman